"Pachtaoge" is a 2019 Hindi song, sung by Arijit Singh. The music is by B Praak and the lyrics are written by Jaani.

Background and release 
Originally, the song was sung by Atif Aslam, but was re-recorded by Arijit Singh. The song was released on 23 August 2019 by T-series on YouTube.

Music video 
The video was directed by Arvindr Khaira and shot in Shimla in June 2019. The main dance scenes of the song were shot in Gaiety Theatre of Shimla. It is about love, betrayal and heartbreak. The song's music video features Vicky Kaushal, Nora Fatehi as the protagonists, and Prabh Uppal playing the role of antagonist. Vicky and Nora as couple and Prabh as boyfriend of Nora.

Credits and personnel 
 Song – Pachtaoge
 Album – Jaani Ve
 Starring – Vicky Kaushal & Nora Fatehi 
 Featuring – Prabh Uppal
 Singer – Arijit Singh
 Lyrics & Composer – Jaani
 Music – B Praak
 Mix Master – Gurinder Guri
 Recording – Akaash Bambar
 Music Label – T-Series 
 Guitars By – Shomu Seal 
 Flute By – Paras Nath 
 Video Director – Arvindr Khaira
 Dop – R Dee
 Editor/Grade – Zipsi 
 Asst. Director- Satnam, Sukhman Sukhu, Har G 
 Jaani's Assistant – Gurashish Romana Steadicam: Amaninder Singh 
 Production – Fateh Films & Sai Film 
 Photographer – Shivam 
 Choreographer – Sumit 
 Art Director – Pinky Art 
 Prabh Uppal costume – Anupama Garg 
 Vicky Kaushal and  Nora Fatehi costume – Amandeep Kaur

References 

Hindi songs
Arijit Singh songs
Atif Aslam songs
2018 songs
Indian songs
T-Series (company) singles